The Human Proteome Organization (HUPO) is an international consortium of national proteomics research associations, government researchers, academic institutions, and industry partners. The organization was launched in February 2001, and it promotes the development and awareness of proteomics research, advocates on behalf of proteomics researchers throughout the world, and facilitates scientific collaborations between members and initiatives. Ultimately, it is organized to gain a better and more complete understanding of the human proteome.

Congress 
Since 2002, HUPO organizes one international congress each year, with past congresses held in Orlando in 2018, in Dublin in 2017, in Taiwan in 2016 and in Vancouver 2015.

Awards 
HUPO awards multiple awards each year, among them the
 Distinguished Service Award
 Translational Proteomics Award
 Science & Technology Award
 Discovery in Proteomic Sciences Award
 Distinguished Achievement Award in Proteomic Sciences

See also
 Human Genome Organisation
 Human Genome Project
 Proteomics Standards Initiative
 Human Proteome Project

References

External links
HUPO

Proteomics
Research projects